An anicut (Originated from Tamil language  அணைக்கட்டு - Aṇaikaṭṭu and Kannada language ಆಣೆಕಟ್ಟು - Āṇekaṭṭu) is a masonry check dam that is constructed across a stream to impound water for maintaining and regulating irrigation. The water stored behind an anicut can be used for irrigation of crops or drinking water for humans and livestock. They also are used to increase the residence of water to recharge groundwater, especially wells located downstream. Anicuts are also used in wildlife sanctuaries to provide sufficient water hole for will animals or to provide habitats for aquatic flora and fauna.

Construction 
The selection of an appropriate site for construction is very important as to minimize cost and maximize efficacy. The site should be where maximum storage of water is possible with minimum dam length, such as a deep, narrow section of a valley with steep slopes. Anicuts require a stream gradient of more than 1:100.

References 

Masonry dams